Mister Dynamite is a 1935 American action film directed by Alan Crosland and written by Doris Malloy and Harry Clork. The film stars Edmund Lowe, Jean Dixon, Victor Varconi, Esther Ralston, Verna Hillie and Minor Watson. The film was released on April 22, 1935, by Universal Pictures.

Plot
Private detective T.N. Thompson, nicknamed "Dynamite" due to his initials, takes an interest when a man is murdered in San Francisco leaving a casino.

The dead man, D.H. Matthews, had an argument outside the casino with Jarl Dvorjak, a celebrated pianist who was gambling while his aloof and money-mad wife Charmian was away. Dvorjak's acquaintance with Mona Lewis led him to the casino, which is owned by her father Clark Lewis and closed by the police after the killing.

Mona becomes a suspect, particularly after Dvorjak's business manager Carey Williams is killed as well. When the pianist himself is shot while playing an organ, Thompson puts everything together and reveals to all that Matthews had actually been a son of Dvorjak's from a previous marriage who was conspiring with Charmian to gain his fortune.

Cast  
Edmund Lowe as T.N. Thompson / Mr. Dynamite
Jean Dixon as Lynn Marlo
Victor Varconi as Jarl Dvorjak
Esther Ralston as Charmian Dvorjak
Verna Hillie as Mona Lewis
Minor Watson as Clark Lewis
Robert Gleckler as James V. King 
Jameson Thomas as Carey Williams
Greta Meyer as Jans 
Frank Lyman as D.H. Matthews
G. Pat Collins as Rod
Bradley Page as Felix
James P. Burtis as Joe
Matt McHugh as Sunshine

Development 
According to Layman and Rivett, the script for Mister Dynamite was based on a screen treatment written by Dashiell Hammett, commissioned by Darryl Zanuck at Warner Bros. for "another original Sam Spade story," following the first film adaption of Hammett's The Maltese Falcon. Hammett's commission for that treatment was for "motion picture production...featuring the actor, William Powell." Zanuck rejected the treatment, explaining that "The finished story [had] none of qualifications of Maltese Falcon, although the same character was in both stories." Rights to the treatment reverted to Hammett, who reworked it, re-titling it On the Make and renaming the detective character Gene Richmond. After further re-work, and another change of the detective's name (to T. N. Thompson), the treatment was sold to Universal in 1935, with the script "liberally reworked" by Malloy and Clork.

References

External links 
 

1935 films
American action films
1930s action films
Universal Pictures films
Films directed by Alan Crosland
American black-and-white films
1930s English-language films
1930s American films